Hannover Airport is a railway station located under the terminal of Hannover Airport, Germany. The station is located on a branch of the Heath Railway. The train services are operated by Deutsche Bahn as part of the Hanover S-Bahn.

Train services
The following services currently call at the station:

Hannover S-Bahn services  Hannover Airport - Langenhagen - Hannover - Weetzen - Hameln - Paderborn
Hannover S-Bahn services  Hannover Airport - Langenhagen - Hannover - Hannover Messe/Laatzen

The S5 service provides a half-hourly service throughout the day, whilst the S8 operates only when there is a major event at the Messe (fair). Journey time between the airport and the city's main railway station (Hannover Hauptbahnhof) is 17 minutes.

References

External links
 

Railway stations in Lower Saxony
Hannover S-Bahn stations
Buildings and structures in Hanover Region
Railway stations located underground in Germany
Railway stations in Germany opened in 2000